Jan Svatoš (born 7 February 1910, date of death unknown) was a Czech cross-country skier. He competed in the men's 50 kilometre event at the 1936 Winter Olympics. He used to live in Trhanov, his sportclub was Sněhaři Domažlice.

References

1910 births
Year of death missing
Czech male cross-country skiers
Olympic cross-country skiers of Czechoslovakia
Cross-country skiers at the 1936 Winter Olympics
Place of birth missing